Elfriede Datzig (26 July 1922 – 27 January 1946) was an Austrian film actress. Following the Anschluss, Datzig appeared in a number of films made by Wien-Film such as the 1939 comedy Anton the Last. She married the actor Albert Hehn. After the war, she formed a band (Hit Kid Swingsters) and sang with Mady Rahl for the USO. In 1946, she died at the age of 23 due to an allergic reaction to penicillin.

Selected filmography
 Finale (1938)
 Anton the Last (1939)
 Hotel Sacher (1939)
 Fräulein Figaro (short, 1939)
 Roses in Tyrol (1940)
 My Daughter Lives in Vienna (1940)
 The Waitress Anna (1941)
 The Secret Countess (1942)
 The War of the Oxen (1943)
 Black on White (1943)
 The Eternal Tone (1943)
 Trip Acquaintance (1943)
 The White Dream (1943, unfinished)
 Seven Letters (1944)
 The False Bride (1945)

References

Bibliography 
  Dassanowsky, Robert. Austrian Cinema: A History. McFarland & Company, 2005.
  Polt, Rudolf. The Films of Elfriede Datzig. 2011.
  Polt, Rudolf. The Diary of Elfriede Datzig. 2011.

External links 
 

1922 births
1946 deaths
Austrian film actresses
Actresses from Vienna
20th-century Austrian actresses